Automeris anikmeisterae is a moth of the family Saturniidae. It is found in Nicaragua and Costa Rica.

References

Moths described in 2011
Moths of Central America
Hemileucinae